Balaji K. Kumar is an Indian film director. 
His first film as a director in Tamil cinema was Vidiyum Munn, a 2013 thriller. It received positive reviews from critics. Then he started his career as story board artist for advertising firms like Ogilvy & Mather, JWT, Saatchi & Saatchi.

Filmography

As director

Other films
 9 lives of Mara - Best film in HP Lovecraft film festival, 2007
 Twelve Twisted Tricks

References 

Living people
Tamil-language film directors
Year of birth missing (living people)
Place of birth missing (living people)